Eda Kristy Cabilan (born December 14, 1988), known professionally as Eda Nolan, is a Filipina actress, best known for her role as Junniper, the shy, 'promdi' girl, in ABS-CBN's sitcoms, Let's Go and Gokada Go. Nolan has been a member of Star Magic, ABS CBN's circle of homegrown talents, since 2006.

Career

Nolan first started as a contestant in ABS-CBN's reality-based talent search Star Circle Quest: Season 2 in 2004. She was part of the Top 25, but never made it to the finals. Eventually, Eda was asked to audition for Star Magic and still she didn't get picked. When she was about to leave ABS-CBN she met Mr. M. Talked to her and asked her to come back after graduation.

After high school graduation, Eda went back to Manila to undergo training and workshop in acting, singing and dancing. That lasted for six months. After the training, Eda patiently waited for an offer. Getting bored and feeling it was not just her time yet, she decided to go back to Cebu. And just when she made up her mind to pursue her studies, she got a call asking her to audition for the sitcom Let's Go. This time, luckily she got picked.

Filmography

Television

Movies

Controversy

Wowowee incident
On May 12, 2007, episode of Wowowee, to promote ABS-CBN's new teen comedy "Gokada Go!", cast members from the show performed a dance number as part of the entertainment segment of the show. Nolan's tube top became loose, exposing one of her breasts. Although producers claimed that she had been wearing a skin-colored bra, Wowowee received a 3-day suspension from the Movie and Television Review and Classification Board.

Concealed pregnancy
Eda, has not been seen on TV after she left a sitcom, "That's my Doc!" on ABS-CBN (2007). But then everyone was shocked when she was seen again on TV, news this February 2008. It was revealed that Eda gave birth to a healthy baby boy on February 8. Her boyfriend, teen actor from GMA 7 named Gian Carlos (Star Struck Batch 3) is the father of her son. Eda seemed very happy when she was interviewed by Boy Abunda of The Buzz (An ABS-CBN talkshow).

References

External links 
Eda Nolan profile at ABS-CBN Forum

1988 births
Filipino child actresses
Filipino television actresses
People from Cebu City
Actresses from Cebu
Star Magic
Star Circle Quest participants
Living people